The 2015 PGA Tour of Australasia was a series of men's professional golf events played mainly in Australia. The main tournaments on the PGA Tour of Australasia are played in the southern summer, so they are split between the first and last months of the year.

Schedule
The following table lists official events during the 2015 season.

Order of Merit
The Order of Merit was based on prize money won during the season, calculated in Australian dollars.

Awards

Notes

References

External links

PGA Tour of Australasia
Australasia
PGA Tour of Australasia
PGA Tour of Australasia